Lilium tsingtauense, also known as twilight lily, is an East Asian species of plants in the lily family. It is native to Korea and eastern China (Anhui + Shandong Provinces).

Lilium tsingtauense is an herb up to 85 cm tall, growing as a single stem from a scaly bulb. The plant bears loose umbels of 6 (but may be up to 15) upright, unscented, shallow trumpet-shaped flowers, that blossom under partial sunlight. These appear in midsummer and are orange or reddish-orange with maroon spots.

It is named for the city of Tsingtao (Qingdao) in The People's Republic of China.

References

tsingtauense
Flora of North-Central China
Flora of Southeast China
Flora of Korea
Plants described in 1904